Simulationism can refer to:
 The imitation of characteristics of a certain genre of roleplaying game
 An art movement of the 1980s (aka Neo-Geo or Post-Conceptualism) that refers to technology replacing nature in art
 Associated with the simulation hypothesis